Ericeia rhanteria is a moth in the  family Erebidae. It is found in New Guinea.

References

Moths described in 1914
Ericeia